Un Regard 9 is the title of both the CD and DVD from Lara Fabian's 2005/2006 tour of the same name which followed her 2005 studio release, titled 9.  The CD and DVD were both released separately and together as a limited edition box set.  The CD and DVD were both recorded live on 29 March 2006 at the Zenith in Paris.  The CD presents 15 live performances plus a brand new song, "Aime," recorded in a studio in Montreal, Quebec. This song has been recorded in both English and French, though the latter version is the only one officially released so far. It was initially presented live during a few concerts in Belgium as gift for her native Belgium fans, but the enthusiastic response and feedback was so huge that Lara felt she should record the song and include it on a forthcoming release.

The entire live concert features songs from Lara's latest studio album "9" and old songs all performed acoustically. Certain songs like "Tout" for instance were completely re-arranged to fit with this new sound and the concept of the show. A stand-out moment during the concert is the homage Lara makes to her idol Barbra Streisand, singing "Papa Can You Hear Me" and "A Piece Of Sky" both taken from Streisand's 1983 movie "Yentl." These two songs had been previously performed in medley by Lara, back in 1997, during a concert in Québec at the time "Pure" was released. This time around, these songs get the chance to fully showcase Lara's amazing vocals on a record. On the DVD one can find tracks that were intentionally left off the CD, like "Je T'Aime" and two English songs taken from Lara's two English records, "Broken Vow" and "I Guess I Loved You". According to Lara, these tracks had a more visual aspect on them than just being simply listened on a record. Also presented on this DVD is the nearly 10-minute performance of "Humana", a track and single taken off 1997 album "Pure".  "Humana" went longer than expected during the concert due to the enthusiasm of the public.

CD track listing

DVD track listing
 Je t’aime
 Les Homéricains
 J’y crois encore
 Il ne manquait que toi
 Tu es mon autre
 Si tu n’as pas d’amour
 Silence
 Speranza
 I Guess I Loved You
 Broken Vow
 Humana
 Un Ave Maria
 Immortelle
 Bambina
 Tout
 Le Tour du Monde
 L'homme qui n'avait pas de maison
 La Lettre
 Papa, Can You Hear Me?
 A Piece Of Sky
 Je me souviens

Charts

References

Lara Fabian albums
2006 live albums